The Royal Scottish Academy (RSA) is the country’s national academy of art. It promotes contemporary Scottish art.

The Academy was founded in 1826 by eleven artists meeting in Edinburgh. Originally named the Scottish Academy, it became the Royal Scottish Academy on being granted a royal charter in 1838.

The RSA maintains a unique position in the country as an independently funded institution led by eminent artists and architects to promote and support the creation, understanding, and enjoyment of visual arts through exhibitions and related educational events.

Overview
In addition to a continuous programme of exhibitions, the RSA also administers scholarships, awards, and residencies for artists who live and work in Scotland. The RSA's historic collection of important artworks and an extensive archive of related material chronicling art and architecture in Scotland over the last 180 years are housed in the National Museums Collection Centre at Granton, and are available to researchers by appointment. Displays of the historic collections are mounted whenever possible.

Its home since 1911 has been the Royal Scottish Academy Building on The Mound, Princes Street, Edinburgh, adjacent to the National Gallery of Scotland building. The building is managed by the National Galleries of Scotland but the 1910 Order grants the RSA permanent administration offices in the building.  Exhibition space is shared throughout the year with the Scottish National Gallery and other organisations (Exhibiting Societies of Scottish Artists). The building, originally designed by William Henry Playfair, was recently refurbished as part of the Playfair Project and is now part of the Scottish National Gallery complex.

Academicians

The RSA is led by a body of eminent artist and architect members who encompass a broad cross-section of contemporary Scottish art. Members are known as Academicians, and are entitled to use the post-nominal letters RSA. The president uses the postnominal letters PRSA while in office, and PPRSA (Past President of the RSA) thereafter.

Academicians are elected to the Academy by their peers. There are also Honorary Academicians (HRSA). After amendments to the Supplementary Charter in 2005, once Associates (ARSA) have submitted a Diploma work into the Permanent Collection of the RSA, they are then entitled to full membership of the Academy. The membership includes 30 Honorary Academicians and 104 Academicians. From 2010–12, the RSA President was Professor Bill Scott, Secretary Arthur Watson and Treasurer Professor Ian Howard. In 2018, Joyce W. Cairns was elected as the first female President in the history of the Academy. Current RSA President, Gareth Fisher is joined by Secretary Edward Summerton RSA and Treasurer Delia Baillie RSA.

Past Presidents

See also
Royal West of England Academy

Notes

References
Esme Gordon (1976) The Royal Scottish Academy of Painting, Sculpture & Architecture 1826-1976. Edinburgh.

External links

 The Royal Scottish Academy

1826 establishments in Scotland
Cultural infrastructure completed in 1826
Category A listed buildings in Edinburgh
Archives in Scotland
 
Arts organisations based in Scotland
 
 
 
Academy
Academies of arts
Art
New Town, Edinburgh
Organizations established in 1826
Scottish contemporary art